The Varignon frame, named after Pierre Varignon, is a mechanical device which can be used to determine an optimal location of a warehouse for the destribution of goods to a set of shops. Optimal means that the sum of the weighted distances of the shops to the warehouse should be minimal. If the influence of friction and other odds of the real world are neglected, the knot will take a position of equilibrium . It can be shown (see below), that point  is the optimal location which minimizes the weighted sum of distances
(1): .
The optimization problem is called Weber problem.

Mechanical Problem - Optimization Problem 

If the holes have locations  and the masses of the weights are  then the force acting at the i-th string has the magnitude  (: constant of gravity) and direction  (unitvector). Summing up all forces and cancelling the common term  one gets the equation
(2):.
(At the point of equilibrium the sum of all forces is zero !)

This is a non-linear system for the coordinates of point  which can be solved iteratively by the Weiszfeld-algorithm (see below)

The connection between equation (1) and equation (2) is:
(3): 
Hence Function  has at point  a local extremum and the Varignon frame provides the optimal location experimentally.

Example 

For the following example the points are

 
and the weights 
.
The second picture shows level curves which consist of points of equal but not optimal sums. Level curves can be used for assigning areas, where the weighted sums do not exceed a fixed level. Geometrically they are implicit curves with equations 
 (see equation (1)).

Special cases  n=1 und n=2 
 In case of  one gets .
In this case the level curves  (points with the same  not-optimal sum) are confocal ellipses  with the points  as common foci.

Weiszfeld-algorithm and a fixpoint problem 

(4):
which describes an iteration. A suitable starting point is the center of mass with mass  in point :
.
This algorithm is called  Weiszfeld-algorithm.<ref>see Facility location, p. 9</ref>

Formula (4) can be seen as the iteration formula for determining the fixed point of function
(5) 
with fixpoint equation

(see fixed point)

Remark on numerical problems:
The iteration algorithm described here may have numerical problems if point   is close to one of the points .

 See also 
 Fermat point (case  )
 Varignon's theorem
 geometric median

 External links 
 MathePrisma Uni Wuppertal: Lösung eines Standort-Problems mit GeoGebra
 The Frame of Varignon: Mathematical Treatment

 References 

 Uwe Götze: Risikomanagement, Physica-Verlag HD, 2013, S. 268
  Andrew Wood, Susan Roberts : Economic Geography, Taylor & Francis, 2012, p. 22
 H. A. Eiselt, Carl-Louis Sandblom :Operations Research, Springer Berlin Heidelberg, 2010, p. 239
 Robert E. Kuenne: General Equilibrium Economics'', Palgrave Macmillan UK, 1992, p. 226

Cartography